Daphne, Op. 82, is an opera in one act by Richard Strauss, subtitled "Bucolic Tragedy in One Act". The German libretto was by Joseph Gregor. The opera is based loosely on the mythological figure Daphne from Ovid's Metamorphoses and includes elements taken from The Bacchae by Euripides.

Performance history

The first performance of the opera took place at the Semperoper in Dresden on 15 October 1938.  It was originally intended as a double bill with Strauss' Friedenstag, but as the scale of Daphne grew, that idea was abandoned. The conductor of the first performance was Karl Böhm, to whom the opera was dedicated.
The United States premiere of the opera was performed on October 10, 1960 in a concert version at Town Hall in Manhattan with Gloria Davy in the title role, Florence Kopleff as Gaea, Robert Nagy as Leukippos,  Jon Crain as Apollo, Lawrence Davidson as Peneios, and The Little Orchestra Society under conductor Thomas Scherman.

Roles

Synopsis 
The chaste girl Daphne sings a hymn of praise to nature. She loves the sunlight as trees and flowers do, but she has no interest in human romance. She cannot return the love of her childhood friend Leukippos, and she refuses to put on the ceremonial clothes for the coming festival of Dionysos, leaving Leukippos with the dress she has rejected.

Daphne's father Peneios tells his friends he is certain that the gods will soon return among men. He advises preparing a feast to welcome Apollo. Just then a mysterious herdsman appears. Peneios sends for Daphne to care for the visitor.

The strange herdsman tells Daphne that he has watched her from his chariot, and repeats to her phrases from the hymn to nature she sang earlier. He promises her that she need never be parted from the sun, and she accepts his embrace. But when he begins to speak of love she becomes fearful and runs out.

At the festival of Dionysos, Leukippos is among the women wearing Daphne's dress, and he invites her to dance. Believing him to be a woman she agrees, but the strange herdsman stops the dance with a thunderclap and says she has been deceived. Daphne answers that both Leukippos and the stranger are in disguise, and the stranger reveals himself as the sun-god Apollo. Daphne refuses both her suitors, and Apollo pierces Leukippos with an arrow.

Daphne mourns with the dying Leukippos. Apollo is filled with regret. He asks Zeus to give Daphne new life in the form of one of the trees she loves. Daphne is transformed, and she rejoices in her union with nature. This transformation scene, the metamorphosis, is opulently silvery in the string section.

Recordings

References
Notes

Sources
Kennedy, Michael, in Holden, Amanda (ed.) (2001), The New Penguin Opera Guide, New York: Penguin Putnam.

External links
BBC Opera guide: Daphne.
Daphne, roles, synopsis, German libretto (opera-guide.ch)

Operas by Richard Strauss
German-language operas
Operas
One-act operas
1938 operas
Operas based on Metamorphoses
Operas based on works by Euripides
Works based on The Bacchae